Robert Noell was Chief Justice of Jamaica in 1688.

References 

Chief justices of Jamaica
Year of birth missing
Year of death missing
17th-century Jamaican judges